Rights and Humanity was founded by Professor Julia Häusermann MBE in 1986. Established as an international not-for-profit association under Swiss law, Rights and Humanity is multi-faith and multi-cultural by philosophy, composition and action. Its premise is that international human rights law and the principles of humanity—the values shared across faiths and cultures—together provide a legal framework and moral compass for global action for progress. Its approach is stated to be holistic and cooperative, seeking progress rather than laying blame, with an ethic of cooperation. In 2003, the association's patrons and some global leaders signed 'The Rights and Humanity Principles of Responsibility'.

Rights and Humanity states that it focuses on:

promoting economic and social justice through the practical realisation of human rights as a foundation for peace, rather than monitoring violations of human rights.
developing education in human rights and responsibilities, peace and sustainability in public policy, corporate, professional, and daily life.

  

Rights and Humanity has a YouTube channel with several short videos outlining their achievements.

Achievements

During the last 30 years, Rights and Humanity, according to its founder, has played a significant role in shaping global policy and practice through the integration of a "human rights approach".  It has chosen to focus on various priority issues of the day, including HIV/AIDS, poverty, health, water,  and sanitation, participatory democracy, cultural rights, complex emergencies, and the global financial crisis. For each issue Rights and Humanity:
brings together public, private, and civil society stakeholders to analyse issues, identify necessary reforms, and adopt common strategies
encourages implementation of the agreed strategies through policy advice to UN agencies, governments, and NGOs, demonstration pilot projects, education, and professional training.

The "human rights approach to development" pioneered by Rights and Humanity has been adopted by UN agencies, governments, and NGOs around the world. The association has demonstrated how discrimination and social exclusion are among the root causes of poverty and preventable ill-health. Evaluations have established that this approach is saving and bettering millions of lives around the world.

Rights and Humanity has resolved deadlock between governments on a number of sensitive issues such as those between:
Western/Northern states and Eastern/Southern states before the World Conference on Human Rights, Vienna, 1993, to forge global consensus on the universality of human rights
Islamic and Western states at the Fourth World Conference on Women, Beijing, 1995, to ensure that adolescent girls receive health information and services
Israeli and Arab delegates before the World Conference on Racism, Durban, 2001, to achieve joint recognition of both the atrocities of the Holocaust and the suffering of the Palestinian people.

Some examples of Rights and Humanity's thought leadership include:
at the request of the then UK Prime Minister, adopting recommendations for a Just and Sustainable World Economy at a Global Leaders Congress in preparation for the G20 London Summit (2009)
achieving consensus on a Call for Action at a 2nd Global Leaders Congress entitled "Global Solutions to Global Challenges: Think, Unite, Act" (2011)

Patrons and officers

International Patrons include: the Dalai Lama, Archbishop Emeritus Desmond Tutu, Prince Hassan bin Talal, Dadi Janki Convenor of the Brahma Kumaris World Spiritual University, Sir Sigmund Sternberg

Women's Human Rights and Empowerment Network Patron: Mrs Cherie Blair

President: Professor Julia Häusermann MBE

References

Human rights organisations based in Switzerland